Alec Stewart (22 February 1915 – 17 November 1976) was an Australian rules footballer who played for the North Melbourne Football Club in the Victorian Football League (VFL).

Notes

External links 

1915 births
1976 deaths
Australian rules footballers from Victoria (Australia)
North Melbourne Football Club players